Chocope is a district of the Ascope Province, in the La Libertad Region of Peru.

In 1940 there were 1,302 people in Chocope.

References